The 2000 Australian Super Touring Car Championship was a CAMS sanctioned motor racing competition open to Super Touring Cars. It was the eighth running of an Australian series for Super Touring Cars and the sixth to be contested under the Australian Super Touring Championship name. The series, which was promoted as the '2000 BOC Gases Australian Super Touring Championship', began on 28 May 2000 at Oran Park Raceway and ended on 11 February 2001 at Oran Park Raceway after eight rounds.

Future Touring Cars
With Super Touring competitor numbers dropping after the withdrawal of the factory supported Audi and Volvo teams, the grids for the 2000 championship were bolstered with cars from the Future Touring Car category. This category, which catered for V8 powered cars that had competed previously in AUSCAR racing, made its debut in a support event to the 1999 Bathurst 500. While the Future Touring Cars and the Super Touring Cars raced together in the same events, drivers competed for two separate titles with separate points scoring for each category.

Teams and drivers
The following teams and drivers competed in the 2000 Australian Super Touring Championship.

Race Calendar
The 2000/2001 Australian Super Touring Championship was contested over an eight-round series. Three races were held at the first round and two races were held at all subsequent rounds. The Future Touring cars competed at seven of the eight rounds, with no entries being received for Round 2 at Lakeside International Raceway.

Points system
Points were awarded on a 15-12-10-8-6-5-4-3-2-1 basis for the top ten race positions in each race. A bonus point was allocated for the fastest lap time set in each qualifying session, with the first three rounds including a separate qualifying session for each race and the remaining rounds each featuring only a single qualifying session.

Results

Drivers Championship

Note: Alan Gurr retained third place in Race 1 of the final round despite losing his championship points as a consequence of his involvement in an on-track incident with Jamie Miller's Toyota.

Independents Cup
A separate award was reserved for Super Touring drivers who were classified as "Independents".

Teams Championship
Multi-car Super Touring teams also competed for a Teams Championship.

See also
 2000 Australian Touring Car season

References

External links
 2000 Racing Results Archive
 2000 Entry List and image of the Paul Morris BMW at www.supertouringregister.com

Australian Super Touring Championship
Super Touring Car Championship